Jacob Gagan (born 25 March 1993) is an Australian professional rugby league footballer currently playing for FC Lezignan in the Elite One Championship. 

He previously played for the Cronulla-Sutherland Sharks, Newcastle Knights and the South Sydney Rabbitohs in the National Rugby League.

Background
Born in Westmead, New South Wales, Gagan played his junior rugby league for the Cabramatta Two Blues, before being signed by the Parramatta Eels.

Playing career

Early career
From 2010 to 2012, Gagan played for the Parramatta Eels' NYC team. In 2010, he played for the Australian Schoolboys. In 2013, he joined the Manly Warringah Sea Eagles on a 1-year contract. In November 2013, he signed a one-year contract with the Cronulla-Sutherland Sharks starting in 2014.

2014
In round 13 of the 2014 NRL season, Gagan made his NRL debut for Cronulla-Sutherland against the St. George Illawarra Dragons, playing on the wing in the Sharks' 0-30 loss at WIN Stadium. In July, he re-signed with Cronulla on a two-year contract.  Gagan made a total of seven appearances for Cronulla in the 2014 NRL season as the club finished last on the table.

2016
In November, after missing out on NRL selection for Cronulla-Sutherland throughout the entire 2015 and 2016 seasons, Gagan signed a one-year contract with the Newcastle Knights starting in 2017.

2017
Gagan made his Knights debut in round 5 of the 2017 season against his former club Cronulla-Sutherland, scoring a try. That would be his lone appearance for the Knights as he was not offered a new contract beyond 2017. In November, he signed a 1-year contract with the South Sydney Rabbitohs starting in 2018.

2018
Gagan spent the entirety of 2018 playing for foundation club North Sydney in the Intrust Super Premiership NSW competition.

2019
Gagan made his debut for South Sydney in round 3 of the 2019 NRL season against Manly-Warringah after being called into the side as a replacement for the injured Greg Inglis.

2020
In February, it was revealed that Gagan had been released by South Sydney.

On 26 Jun 2020 it was reported that he had signed for FC Lézignan XIII in the Elite One Championship

References

External links

South Sydney Rabbitohs profile
Newcastle Knights profile
NRL profile

1993 births
Living people
Australian rugby league players
Cabramatta Two Blues players
Cronulla-Sutherland Sharks players
Lézignan Sangliers players
Newcastle Knights players
Newtown Jets NSW Cup players
North Sydney Bears NSW Cup players
Rugby league wingers
Rugby league centres
Rugby league players from Sydney
South Sydney Rabbitohs players